Ronald G. Bruno is the former Chairman (1991-1995) and Chief Executive Officer (1990-1995) of Bruno's, Inc., a large Birmingham, Alabama-based supermarket chain. He is a co-founder and chairman of the Bruno Event Team, a Birmingham, Alabama-based sports marketing and event management company. He was a founder of the Bruno's Memorial Classic, now known as the Regions Tradition, a PGA Tour Champions golf tournament. The tournament was founded in December 1991 as the Bruno's Classic. In May 2009, Bruno was inducted into the Alabama Sports Hall of Fame as a Distinguished Alabama Sportsman.

In addition to his duties with Bruno Event Team, Bruno dedicates his time to the Bruno Capital Management Corporation, a family investment company.  He has served as a director since September 1992 and president since September 1995. Additionally, he served in several positions with the $2.9 billion southeastern grocery retailer Bruno’s, Inc. His positions with Bruno’s, Inc. included chairman and CEO from 1991-1995.

Bruno graduated from the University of Alabama in 1974 with a Bachelor of Science in Marketing.  As an alumnus, he has served on the University of Alabama President’s Cabinet and was the Chairman of the Board of Visitors at the College of Commerce and Business.

He currently serves on the President’s Cabinet at the University of Alabama and has also been a Board Member of The Metropolitan Development Board, The Club, United Way and St. Vincent’s Hospital Foundation.
 
During his business career, Bruno has served on the board of directors of the following corporations: Bruno’s Inc., Books a Million, Russell Corporation and South Trust Bank.
 
He is married to Lee Ann Bruno. They have one son, Gregory, who is a recent graduate of the University of Alabama. He and his family attend Our Lady of Sorrows Catholic Church.

References
 http://www.brunoeventteam.com/Ronnie_Bruno.php
 http://www.ashof.org/index.php?src=directory&srctype=display&id=466&view=sportsman_detail
http://www.brunoeventteam.com/documents/BhamMagazineRonnie.Geneprofile.pdf
http://www.answers.com/topic/bruno-s-supermarkets-inc
http://www.bhamwiki.com/w/Ronald_Bruno

Year of birth missing (living people)
Living people
Sportspeople from Birmingham, Alabama